Behadar, also Behadar Kala, is a village and corresponding community development block in Hardoi district of Uttar Pradesh, India. There is a market at Behadar Kalan Hashimpore on Wednesdays and Sundays, with no particular specialisation. The village has 3 primary schools and 0 healthcare facilities. As of 2011, the population of Behadar is 4,458, in 1,194 households.

Villages 
Behadar CD block has the following 90 villages:

References 

Villages in Hardoi district